Mamadouba Yamador "N'Dongo" Camara (born 1945) is a Guinean former footballer. He competed in the men's tournament at the 1968 Summer Olympics.

References

External links
 
 

1945 births
Living people
Guinean footballers
Guinea international footballers
Olympic footballers of Guinea
Footballers at the 1968 Summer Olympics
People from Faranah Region
Association football forwards